Ksenija Marinković (born 18 April 1966) is a Croatian film, television and theatre actress.

Biography 
Ksenija Marinković was born in Virovitica in 1966 where she finished high school. Ever since she was eight until entering the Academy of Dramatic Art in Zagreb, she was involved in the Virovitica theatre as an amateur actress. As a student of the Academy she started to collaborate with the Gavella Drama Theatre and the Histrioni troupe. After graduating from the Academy she spent one year with the Teatar u gostima and has been employed with the ZKM theatre in Zagreb since 1989 where she created some of her most important roles. Some of her significant roles were created outside her theatre and she also starred in TV and feature films.

Filmography

Movie roles

Television roles

References

External links
 

1966 births
Living people
People from Virovitica
Croatian actresses
Croatian film actresses
Croatian stage actresses
Golden Arena winners